Thapsia is a genus of air-breathing land snails, terrestrial pulmonate gastropod mollusks in the subfamily Sheldoniinae of the family Urocyclidae.

Distribution
Species in this genus are found in tropical western Africa, from Senegal to Gabon.

Description
Species attributed to the genus Thapsia sensu lato have shell diameters ranging from about 15 to 30 mm, with 5½-6½ whorls. These rather featureless dextral shells are characterized by a low spire and their yellow to brown color. The spiral sculpture of the postembryonic shell is slender. In some larger * The sculpture of the radial ribs is formed crosswise (like the letter X) or beadlike. The foot shows a long caudal horn.

Species
Thapsia was originally designated in 1860 by German zoologist Johann Christian Albers as a subgenus of Nanina Gray, 1834, non Risso, 1826.

This genus is a heterogeneous assemblage. Because the shell characters of this genus converge with those of the larger specimens of some closely related genera (Saphtia Winter, 2008, Pseudosaphtia Winter, 2008 and Vanmolia Winter, 2008), the delimitation of * To Thapsia s.l. is difficult. There very few papers that describe the anatomical features of this genus.

Thapsia contains the following species:

 Thapsia abyssinica (Jickeli, 1873)
 Thapsia aranea (Preston, 1914)
 Thapsia bartaensis (Preston, 1914)
 Thapsia buchholzi Bourguignat, 1885 
 Thapsia buraensis Verdcourt, 1982
 Thapsia cavernicola d'Ailly, 1910
 Thapsia cinnamomeozonata Pilsbry, 1919
 Thapsia columellaris'' (L. Pfeiffer, 1849)
 Thapsia consobrina (Preston, 1914)
 Thapsia consueta (Preston, 1914)
 Thapsia conuloidea Preston, 1911
 Thapsia curvatula E. von Martens, 1897
 Thapsia decepta E. A. Smith, 1899
 Thapsia densesculpta (Preston, 1914)
 Thapsia depressior (E. A. Smith, 1890)
 Thapsia ebimimbangana Winter, 2008
 Thapsia elgonensis (Preston, 1914)
 Thapsia eminiana (E. A. Smith, 1890)
 Thapsia eremias (Melvill & Ponsonby, 1896)
 Thapsia eucosmia Pilsbry, 1919
 Thapsia exasperata Preston, 1910
 Thapsia gereti Preston, 1910
 Thapsia glomus (E. von Martens, 1860)
 Thapsia grandis Verdcourt, 1982
 Thapsia hanningtoni (Smith, 1890)
 Thapsia inclinans (Preston, 1914)
 Thapsia indecorata (Gould, 1850)
 Thapsia inflata (Preston, 1914)
 Thapsia innocens Preston, 1910
 Thapsia insimulans E. A. Smith, 1899
 Thapsia insulsa Preston, 1910
 Thapsia iridescens (Preston, 1914)
 Thapsia kampalaensis (Preston, 1914)
 Thapsia karamwegasensis Germain, 1923
 Thapsia kibonotoensis d'Ailly, 1910
 Thapsia kigeziensis (Preston, 1913)
 Thapsia lasti (E. A. Smith, 1890)
 Thapsia leroyi Grandidier, 1887
 Thapsia magna Thiele, 1933
 Thapsia majendooensis (Connolly, 1928)
 Thapsia marsabitensis (Preston, 1914)
 Thapsia masakaensis (Preston, 1914)
 Thapsia masukuensis E. A. Smith, 1899
 Thapsia microleuca Verdcourt, 1982
 Thapsia microsculpta Verdcourt, 1982
 Thapsia millestriata (Preston, 1912)
 Thapsia mime (Preston, 1914)
 Thapsia mukandaensis (Preston, 1914)
 Thapsia mukulensis Pilsbry, 1919
 Thapsia multistriata (Preston, 1914)
 Thapsia nemorum (Preston, 1914)
 Thapsia nyikana E. A. Smith, 1899
 Thapsia oleosa (L. Pfeiffer, 1850)
 Thapsia oscitans Connolly, 1925
 Thapsia pallidior (Preston, 1914)
 Thapsia paucispirata Thiele, 1933
 Thapsia pinguis (Krauss, 1848)
 Thapsia pompholyx Pilsbry, 1919
 Thapsia punctata Thiele, 1933
 Thapsia radiata d'Ailly, 1910
 Thapsia rosenbergi Preston, 1909
 Thapsia rufescens Pilsbry, 1919
 Thapsia rufocincta (Connolly, 1941)
 Thapsia rutshuruensis Pilsbry, 1919
 † Thapsia senutae Pickford, 2019 
 Thapsia silvaepluviosae d'Ailly, 1910
 Thapsia simulata E. A. Smith, 1899
 Thapsia snelliConnolly, 1925  
 Thapsia stanleyvillensis Pilsbry, 1919
 Thapsia submixta Germain, 1935
 Thapsia tribulationis (Preston, 1914)
 Thapsia tricolor (Connolly, 1925)
 Thapsia troglodytes (Morelet, 1848) - the type species, originally described as Helix troglodytes Morelet, 1848
 Thapsia uluguruensis Verdcourt, 1982
 Thapsia unguinosa Pollonera, 1898
 Thapsia urguessensis (Preston, 1914)
 Thapsia usambarensis Verdcourt, 1982
 Thapsia usitata (Preston, 1914)
 Thapsia vernhouti (Preston, 1913)
 Thapsia vestii (Jickeli, 1873)
 Thapsia wieringai de Winter, 2008
 Thapsia woodhousei (Preston, 1914)
 Thapsia yalaensis Germain, 1923
 Thapsia zambiensis Pilsbry, 1919

Synonyms
 Thapsia calamechroa (Jonas, 1843): synonym of Saphtia calamechroa (Jonas, 1843) (superseded combination)
 Thapsia calamichroa (Jonas, 1843): synonym of Saphtia calamechroa (Jonas, 1843) (invalid; incorrect subsequent spelling)
 Thapsia chrysosticta (Morelet, 1867): synonym of Apothapsia thomensis (Dohrn, 1866)
 Thapsia euriomphala Bourguignat, 1883: synonym of Thapsia abyssinica (Jickeli, 1873)
 Thapsia germaini Connolly, 1925: synonym of Apothapsia thomensis (Dohrn, 1866)
 Thapsia gerstenbrandti (Preston, 1914): synonym of Thapsia elgonensis (Preston, 1914) (junior synonym)
 Thapsia mixta E. A. Smith, 1899: synonym of Thapsia pinguis (Krauss, 1848)
 Thapsia rumrutiensis Preston, 1911: synonym of Afroguppya rumrutiensis (Preston, 1911) (original combination)
 Thapsia sjoestedti d'Ailly, 1896: synonym of Vanmolia sjoestedti (d'Ailly, 1896) (original combination)
 Thapsia thomensis (Dohrn, 1866): synonym of Apothapsia thomensis'' (Dohrn, 1866)

References

 Bank, R. A. (2017). Classification of the Recent terrestrial Gastropoda of the World. Last update: July 16th, 2017.

External links
 Albers, J. C. & Martens, E. von. (1860). Die Heliceen nach natürlicher Verwandtschaft systematisch geordnet von Joh. Christ. Albers. Ed. 2. Pp. i-xviii, 1-359. Leipzig: Engelman
 Winter, A. J. de. (2008). Redefinition of Thapsia Albers, 1860, and description of three more helicarionoid genera from western Africa (Gastropoda, Stylommatophora). Zoologische Mededelingen 82(41): 441–477

 
Urocyclidae